Kacio Fonseca da Silva Freitas (born 13 May 1994) is a Brazilian male track cyclist. He competed in the team sprint event at the 2015 UCI Track Cycling World Championships.

References

External links
 
 
 
 
 

1994 births
Living people
Brazilian track cyclists
Brazilian male cyclists
Place of birth missing (living people)
Cyclists at the 2015 Pan American Games
Cyclists at the 2019 Pan American Games
Pan American Games bronze medalists for Brazil
Pan American Games medalists in cycling
Medalists at the 2015 Pan American Games
20th-century Brazilian people
21st-century Brazilian people